The Willemspark (literally William's Park) is a neighbourhood in the Centrum district of The Hague, Netherlands. It is bordered by the Zeestraat to the south-east, the Scheveningseveer, the Mauritskade and the Dr. Kuyperstraat to the south-east, the Prinsessegracht to the north-east and the Javastraat to the north-west. The park was originally property of king William II, but he sold the area to the municipality of The Hague in 1855, after which it became a villa park. Iconic to the neighbourhood are the Alexanderstraat and the Sophialaan that intersect on Plein 1813. This square is marked by a monument commemorating the defeat of Napoleon and the establishment of the Sovereign Principality of the United Netherlands.

References

Geography of The Hague